Paracerceis is a genus of isopod crustacean in the family Sphaeromatidae. It contains the following species:
Paracerceis caudata (Say, 1818)
Paracerceis cohenae Kensley, 1984
Paracerceis cordata (Richardson, 1899)
Paracerceis dollfusi Lombardo, 1985
Paracerceis edithae Boone, 1930
Paracerceis gilliana (Richardson, 1899)
Paracerceis glynni Kensley, 1984
Paracerceis holdichi Kussakin & Malyutina, 1993
Paracerceis nuttingi (Boone, 1921)
Paracerceis richardsonae Lombardo, 1988
Paracerceis sculpta (Holmes, 1904)
Paracerceis spinulosa Espinosa-Perez & Hendrickx, 2002
Paracerceis tomentosa Schultz & McCloskey, 1967

References

Sphaeromatidae